Tekarei Tibwere Russell (born 1937) is a former Gilbertese politician.

As a child, she attended Elaine Bernacchi School. She later became a secondary school teacher in 1959, in Bikenibeu. Russell became the first woman to be elected to the Legislative Council of the Gilbert and Ellice Islands colony, when she was elected MP for South Tarawa (the capital city) in 1971. Re-elected in 1975, she was appointed Minister for Health and Family Planning serving from 1975 to 1977; she later retired from politics and returned to teaching. She was awarded the Pride of Kiribati medal.

References

1937 births
Living people
Members of the House of Assembly (Kiribati)
Government ministers of Kiribati
Women government ministers of Kiribati
I-Kiribati schoolteachers
People from the Gilbert Islands
20th-century I-Kiribati women politicians
20th-century I-Kiribati politicians